Mikaila is the self titled third and final album by American former actress and singer Mikaila. The album was released on March 6, 2001, and includes Mikaila's hit song "So in Love with Two". She was previously signed to the independent label Union Records. When Mikaila was with Union Records she released her debut Gospel album in 1996, This Little Light. A year later in 1997 after being cast on Wishbone, Mikaila released her second album Dreams.

Release
The album was released by Island Records on March 6, 2001. In advance of the album's release, Mikaila performed on Macy's Thanksgiving Day Parade and on Fox Family Channel's Front Row Center Concert Series. The album itself was a moderate commercial success debuting at number twenty on the US Billboard Top Heatseekers chart on the date of March 24, 2001 and staying on the chart for three weeks. Before leaving Island Records and retiring from acting and singing Mikaila released a Spanish album "Mikaila (Spanish Version)".

Singles
The lead single, "So in Love with Two" was released in November 2000, when Mikaila was thirteen years old. Multiple versions of the song were released, including a remixed version by Hex Hector, which was used primarily in radio airplay, and a Spanish-language version titled "Este Amor de Dos". The song peaked at No. 29 on the Rhythmic Top 40 Billboard chart, No. 25 on the Billboard  Hot 100 and No. 27 on Billboards Top 40 Mainstream.

Reception

Critical
Upon its release, the album was subject to mixed reviews from contemporary music critics. AllMusic's Jon Azpiri awarded the album three out of five stars and commended Mikaila for bringing "a much-needed dose of hip-hop to the teen pop genre" but criticizing the ballads as "obligatory".

Track listing
 "So in Love with Two" – 3:26
 "Straight to My Face" – 3:36
 "Forever, For Always, For You" – 4:17
 "Playground" – 3:57
 "Talkin' Bout Me" – 3:44
 "It's All Up to You" – 3:55
 "Perfect World" – 3:59
 "My Dream Is Gone" – 3:34
 "My Heaven" – 3:34
 "Emotional" – 3:12
 "Because of You" – 4:12
 "My Heart Can't Let You Go" – 4:09
 "You Tell Me" – 3:01 (UK and Japanese bonus track)
 "Art of Letting Go" – 3:54 (Japanese bonus track)
 "Este Amor de Dos" (So in Love with Two) – 3:28 (European bonus track)

References

Mikaila albums
2001 debut albums
Island Records albums
Albums produced by Stargate